Fast Forward is the first startup accelerator to focus solely on nonprofit-based technology enterprises, it was founded by Shannon Farley and Kevin Barenblat in 2014. The accelerator provides support, mentorship, and access to financial capital for emerging companies that aim to improve the world, by focusing on poverty, education access, improving health, and environmental degradation.

Funding
Fast Forward attracted in $1.25 million of funding in 2016, notable backers at that time include AT&T, BlackRock, Google and the Omidyar Network. In September 2014, Google partnered with Fast Forward during a funding event for its first cohort, giving $20,000 to each nonprofit, and matching the donations up to $100,000. The first cohort raised a combined $150,000 during the event and 1 million dollars during its time with the accelerator. In July 2019, Fast Forward raised $5 million in funding.

Fast Forward was also funded by Sal Khan of Khan Academy, Premal Shah of Kiva, Charles Best of DonorsChoose, and Leila Janah of SamaSource, Andrew McCollum of Facebook, Josh Reeves of ZenPayroll, Joe Greenstein of Flixster, and others.

References

Other websites
Fast Forward

Organizations based in San Francisco
Startup accelerators